The C.O.M.A. Imprint is a revision of Candiria's 1997 second album Beyond Reasonable Doubt, with remixed and re-recorded renditions of all that album's tracks, excluding "Lost in the Forest", "Mental Politics", and "Intrusive Statements", replacing them with the tracks "Peel This Strip and Fold Here", "Bring the Pain/Multiple Incisions", and "R-Evolutionize-R". Disc 2 contains tracks from some of the band members' side projects.

In 2016, Candiria supported Beyond Reasonable Doubt with a 20th anniversary tour.

Track listing

Beyond Reasonable Doubt 
 "Faction" – 5:14
 "Year One" – 4:55
 "Lost in the Forest" – 8:06
 "Paradigm Shift" – 4:25
 "Tribes" – 5:55
 "Molecular Dialect" – 2:37
 "Divided" – 4:17
 "Mental Politics" – 4:53
 "Riding the Spiral" – 0:35
 "Primary Obstacle" – 3:56
 "Intrusive Statements" – 20:03

The C.O.M.A. Imprint

Disc one 
 "Paradigm Shift" – 4:25
 "Year One" – 4:55
 "Peel This Strip and Fold Here" – 4:19
 "Faction" – 4:55
 "Bring the Pain/Multiple Incisions" – 4:53
 "Riding the Spiral" – 0:29
 "Tribes" – 5:55
 "Primary Obstacle" – 3:49
 "Molecular Dialect" – 2:46
 "Divided" – 4:17
 "R-Evolutionize-R" – 9:30

Disc two 
 "Blue Suede Timbs" (Chief (8)) – 3:18
 "Collective Unconscious" (The Moons Project) – 6:17
 "That Which Survives" (Ghosts of the Canal) – 5:28
 "Let the Mic Go" (Kid Gambino) – 3:12
 "Hypnotic Oceans" (The Moons Project) – 4:45
 "Richard Dreyfuss" (Ghosts of the Canal) – 6:14

Personnel 
Carley Coma – vocals
John Lamacchia – guitar
Eric Matthews – guitar
Michael MacIvor – bass
Kenneth Schalk – drums, programming

References

2002 albums
Candiria albums
Lakeshore Records albums